The Little Thoughts EP is a compilation EP of previously UK-only Bloc Party releases, released on 15 December 2004 in Japan. It combines the UK single "Little Thoughts" with b-sides from the "Helicopter" single.

Track listing

The EP also contains the "Little Thoughts" video as enhanced content.

2004 EPs
2004 compilation albums
Bloc Party compilation albums
V2 Records compilation albums
V2 Records EPs
Bloc Party EPs
Albums produced by Paul Epworth